The State Anthem of the Karelo-Finnish SSR was the national anthem of Karelia (now a federal subject of Russia) when it was a republic of the Soviet Union and known as the Karelo-Finnish SSR.

Background
In 1945, the Karelo-Finnish SSR's government held a competition to create a state anthem.  The winning entry (written by Armas Äikiä and composed by Karl Rautio) was adopted as the SSR's official anthem in the early 1950s until 1956 when it was re-absorbed into the Russian SFSR.  Along with the Georgian and Estonian SSR anthems, it was one of the only three Soviet republic anthems that did not mention the Russian people.

Lyrics

See also
Anthem of the Republic of Karelia

Notes

References

External links
 Anthem of the Karelo-Finnish SSR (Vocal Version by KW30)
 Anthem of the Karelo-Finnish SSR (Vocal Version by Der Klaviermusiker)
 MP3 file
 Lyrics - nationalanthems.info
 Russian lyrics

Karelo-Finnish SSR
Karelo-Finnish Soviet Socialist Republic
Finnish music